Ježevac (Serbian Cyrillic: Јежевац) is a mountain in eastern Serbia, near the town of Petrovac na Mlavi. Its highest peak has an elevation of 675 meters above sea level. Ježevac sharply rises over the southern edge of Mlava river gorge, entering the Homolje region. On the mountain, there is Gornjak Monastery Monastery carved into limestone rocks.

References

Mountains of Serbia